Antoinette Funk (May 30, 1873 – March 26, 1942) was a lawyer and women's rights advocate during the 20th century. She served as the executive secretary of the Congressional Committee of the National American Woman Suffrage Association.

Biography
She was born on May 30, 1873 in Dwight, Illinois as Marie Antoinette Leland to Cyrus Leland and Virginia Antoinette Bouverain Leland. In 1892 she married Charles Thurber Watrous, who died shortly after the marriage. They had one child, Anna Virginia Watrous (Huey)(1893-1973).

In 1893, she married Isaac Lincoln Funk. They had a child Rey Leland Funk. In 1898, she attended Illinois Wesleyan University Law School, where she received J.D. In 1902, she moved to Chicago, where her work for women's rights would begin.

As part of her women's rights advocacy, Funk gave speeches to women's rights groups.

In 1914, Funk  rode stagecoaches across South Dakota and Nevada.  She gave speeches several times a day, speaking at sits ranging from mines to the homes of butchers to organized dinner dances.  Funk particularly enjoyed speaking outdoors because it exposed passersby to her message.  On October 2, 1914, Funk was jailed in Minot, North Dakota for making an unauthorized street speech.

In 1915, she addressed the College Equal Suffrage League of Bryn Mawr College in a speech entitled "The Best Arguments for Woman Suffrage."

In 1917, she also supported the United States war effort during World War I along with other women's rights advocates as a member of the Women's Committee of the Council of Defense.  In 1918, Funk was the vice chairman woman's liberty loan Committee at the Treasury Department.

During Franklin Delano Roosevelt's administration, Funk served as Assistant Commissioner of the Land Office.

She retired from the NAWSA in 1939. In 1942, she died in San Diego, California.

See also
 List of suffragists and suffragettes

References

External links

1873 births
1942 deaths
20th-century American women lawyers
20th-century American lawyers
American suffragists
Illinois Wesleyan University alumni
People from McLean County, Illinois
Illinois lawyers